The 1987 Yugoslavian motorcycle Grand Prix was the sixth round of the 1987 Grand Prix motorcycle racing season. It took place on the weekend of 12–14 June 1987 at the Automotodrom Rijeka.

Classification

500 cc

References

Yugoslav motorcycle Grand Prix
Yugoslavian
Motorcycle Grand Prix
Yugoslavian motorcycle Grand Prix